Jens Andersen Hagen (1832 - ??) was a Norwegian politician for the Conservative Party.

He was elected to the Norwegian Parliament in 1886, representing the constituency of Kristiania, Hønefoss og Kongsvinger. He only served one term. He worked as a tanner.

References

1832 births
Year of death missing
Conservative Party (Norway) politicians
Members of the Storting